A sword of state is a sword, used as part of the regalia, symbolizing the power of a monarch to use the might of the state against its enemies, and his or her duty to preserve thus right and peace. 

It is known to be used in following monarchies:

 Reichsschwert of the Holy Roman Empire, see Imperial Sword
 Kingdom of Denmark, see Danish crown regalia
 Joyeuse, used for the sacre of the king of France. Reputed to be the sword of Charlemagne.
 Kingdom of Hungary
 Kingdom of Bohemia (Czech Republic) – Sword of Saint Wenceslas
 Kingdom of England, later Great Britain, yet later United Kingdom; see Crown Jewels of the United Kingdom
 Kingdom of the Netherlands, see Dutch Royal Regalia (made in 1840 for enthronements)
 Kingdom of Norway, see Regalia of Norway
 Kingdom of Scotland, see Honours of Scotland
 Kingdom of Sweden, see Swedish Royal Regalia, where it is the oldest of the Vasa regalia
 Kingdom of Poland – Szczerbiec, Grunwald Swords, Sigismundus Iustus
 Kingdom of Mysore – Chikka Devaraja Wodeyar, ending with the Krishnaraja Wodeyar II
 Kingdom of Thailand or Siam- the Sword of Victory, one of the five Regalia of Thailand.
 The former Kingdom of the Isle of Man (now a British Crown dependency), bearing the triskelion symbol, annually used on Tynwald Day
 Empire of Russia, see Regalia of the Russian tsars
 The Kingdom of Georgia
 Shangfang Baojian of Chinese dynasties from Han dynasty to Qing dynasty
 The Eodo of Taejo of Joseon Dynasty, Korea
 The Sword of Osman, given to Sultans of the Ottoman Empire;
 Kusanagi, kept by the Emperor of Japan;
 In the former sultanate of the Maldives, being invested on the Monarch in a traditional gong ceremony
 Also in the Malay world, notably in
 the sultanate of Perak, where it gave the name to a 'national' order of knighthood 
 Sarawak (on Borneo)

By analogy, it can even be used in republics, as in the Senate of the state of South Carolina in the United States of America.

See also
Sword of justice – similar part of regalia
Ceremonial weapons – several types can be part of regalia
Sword of the State – a title

References
 

Ceremonial weapons
Formal insignia
Swords